William Elza Williams (May 5, 1857 – September 13, 1921) was a U.S. Representative from Illinois.

Born near Detroit, Illinois, Williams attended the public schools and Illinois College, Jacksonville, Illinois.
He studied law.
He was admitted to the bar in 1880 and practiced in Detroit and Pittsfield, Illinois.
State's attorney of Pike County, Illinois, 1886–1892.
He served as member of the board of aldermen of Pittsfield.
He served as member of the board of education.
He became trial lawyer for the City Railway Co. of Chicago in 1903.

Williams was elected as a Democrat to the Fifty-sixth Congress (March 4, 1899–March 3, 1901).
He resumed the practice of law in Pittsfield, Illinois.

Williams was elected to the Sixty-third and Sixty-fourth Congresses (March 4, 1913–March 3, 1917).
He was an unsuccessful candidate for reelection in 1916 to the Sixty-fifth Congress and for election in 1918 to the Sixty-sixth Congress.
He continued the practice of law until his death in Pittsfield, Illinois, September 13, 1921.
He was interred in Pittsfield West Cemetery.

References

External links

1857 births
1921 deaths
People from Pittsfield, Illinois
Illinois lawyers
Illinois College alumni
District attorneys in Illinois
Illinois city council members
School board members in Illinois
Democratic Party members of the United States House of Representatives from Illinois
19th-century American lawyers